Jean-Christophe Combe (born September 14, 1981) is a French politician.

On July 4, 2022, he was appointed Minister of Solidarity, Autonomy and People with Disabilities in the government of Elisabeth Borne.

Biography

Youth and studies
Jean-Christophe Combe's father is a gymnastics teacher, and his mother is a craftsman. After studying in literary preparatory classes at the Lycée Claude-Monet, he obtained a degree in history at the University of Paris I Panthéon Sorbonne. He graduated from the Paris Institute of Political Studies in 2005. During his studies, he was a technical adviser to the Senate, within the Centrist Union group.

Professional career
Winner of the IEP de Paris, Jean-Christophe Combe joined Deloitte as an associate specializing in the public sector. He left Deloitte a year later, in 2007, when he was appointed chief of staff to the deputy and mayor of Châlons-en-Champagne, Bruno Bourg-Broc (UMP). In 2009, he became chief of staff to the UMP mayor of Saint-Germain-en-Laye, Emmanuel Lamy.

In 2011, he was appointed director of the cabinet of the president of the French Red Cross, Jean-François Mattei. Between 2012 and 2015, he was director of commitment and community life for the French Red Cross. In 2016, he became Acting Director General of the French Red Cross, then in 2017, Director General.

He became Minister of Solidarity, Autonomy and People with Disabilities on July 4, 2022, replacing Damien Abad, in the government of Elisabeth Borne.

References

French Ministers of Labour and Social Affairs
Pantheon-Sorbonne University alumni
Sciences Po alumni
1981 births
Living people
Members of the Borne government